In archaeology, a banjo enclosure is the name of a type of archaeological feature of the British Middle Iron Age. It is so named because in plan it consists of a small round area with a long entrance track leading inward from one direction. This layout gives it the appearance of a frying pan or banjo. The enclosure is defined by a low bank and ditch. The earthworks at the end of the track are sometimes turned outward, creating a funnel effect. The enclosure used to be thought of as a small farming settlement occupied around 400 bc to AD 43; however, because of the lack of finds relating to settlement it is currently thought to be a seasonal ritual centre where feasting occurred.

Sources
 
 
 
 

Iron Age Britain
Archaeological features